The Navy Way is a 1944 American war film directed by William Berke concentrating on US Navy recruit training with many sequences filmed at the Great Lakes Naval Training Center. The film had its premiere at the Genesee Theatre in nearby Waukegan, Illinois.

Plot
Five men enlist in the navy: Frankie, who did it after finding his fiancée Agnes in the arms of another man; Malcolm, a millionaire; Billy, who has never left home and whose father died in World War One; rancher Steve, whose son died in battle; and boxer Johnny, who was drafted.

The five men are in the same company. Steve becomes a father figure to Billy but Johnny is resentful about his boxing career being interrupted. Johnny falls for Ellen, a WAVE.

Johnny wins a fight for his company with a broken hand, impressing the others, although he has constant discipline problems.

During a training exercise Johnny saves Steve from drowning. Frankie and Agnes get married and Ellen and Malcolm fall in love. Johnny finds out and goes on a drunken binge with Malcolm's ex, Trudy. Malcolm tries to get Johnny to come back to base before he gets in trouble but Johnny beats him up.

Johnny takes full responsibility and faces a court martial. Johnny's parents plead his case as does Chaplain Benson. Johnny is given a second chance and the friends go off to fight together.

Cast 
Robert Lowery as Johnny Zumano aka Johnny Jersey
Jean Parker as Ellen Sayre
William Henry as Malcolm Randall
Roscoe Karns as Frankie Gimble
Sharon Douglas as Trudy
Robert Armstrong as CPO Harper
Tom Keene as Steve Appleby
Larry Nunn as Billy Jamison
Mary Treen as Agnes
Wallace Pindell as Sailor Joslin
John 'Skins' Miller as Recruit Pop Lacy
Joseph Crehan as Chaplain Benson
Commander Hjalmar F. Hanson as Great Lakes Naval Station Choir Director
Art Lasky as Fighter
John J. 'Red' Madigan as Sailor

Production
In July 1943 Pine Thomas announced that Jean Parker and Russell Hayden would star and that the film would be shot at the Great Lakes Naval Training School. In September William Henry had replaced Hayden as the lead. Tom Keene signed to play a role under the name "Richard Powers". Jean Parker made the film as the first of a new three-picture contract with Pine-Thomas. The other male lead was given to Robert Lowery, who was signed by Pine Thomas to a long-term contract.

Reception
The film had its world premiere in late March 1944 at the Great Lakes Naval Training Station.

References

External links 
 
The Navy Way at TCMDB
The Navy Way at BFI
Review of film at Variety
 

1944 films
1940s war drama films
American war drama films
1940s English-language films
American black-and-white films
World War II films made in wartime
Films directed by William A. Berke
1944 drama films